Juška or Juska is a surname. Notable people with the surname include:

Andis Juška (born 1985), Latvian tennis player
Antanas Juška (1819–1880), Roman Catholic pastor, lexicographer, and folklorist
Egidijus Juška (born 1975), retired Lithuanian professional footballer
Elise Juska, American novelist, short story writer, and essayist
Gvidas Juška (born 1982), Lithuanian footballer
Jane Juska (born 1933), American author and retired English schoolteacher
Jonas Juška (1815–1886), Lithuanian linguist
Radek Juška (born 1993), Czech track and field athlete
Romualdas Juška (born 1942), retired Lithuanian football player and referee

See also
Juska Savolainen (born 1983), Finnish footballer, who plays as midfielder